The Hamatla Treaty Society handles Treaty negotiations in the BC Treaty Process for a number of First Nations located in the northern Strait of Georgia of British Columbia.

Membership
Campbell River Indian Band (We Wai Kum Nation)
Cape Mudge Indian Band (We Wai Kai Nation)
Kwiakah First Nation

Treaty Process

The Hamatla Treaty Society entered the treaty process in February 1997, reaching as far as Stage 4 in the BC Treaty Process.  However, in the Fall of 2003, negotiations stalled after it became apparent that the five member bands needed time to resolve internal issues.  Former member the Tlowitsis Tribe left the society to independently continue negotiations and former member K’omoks First Nation also left to independently continue negotiations.

See also
Status of First Nations treaties in British Columbia
List of tribal councils in British Columbia

References

First Nations organizations in British Columbia
Vancouver Island
Kwakwaka'wakw